Nannie de Villiers and Irina Selyutina were the defending champions, but Selyutina chose not to compete, and de Villiers chose to participate in the Hobart International instead.

Tathiana Garbin and Émilie Loit won the title.

Seeds

  Virginia Ruano Pascual /  Magüi Serna (first round)
  Tathiana Garbin /  Émilie Loit (winners)
  Eugenia Kulikovskaia /  Tatiana Poutchek (semifinals)
  Catherine Barclay /  Martina Müller (first round)

Results

Draw

References

2003 WTA Tour
Sports competitions in Canberra
2003 in Australian women's sport
2003 in Australian tennis